The City of Bradford Metropolitan District Council elections took place on Thursday 6 May. The 2010 general election was held simultaneously, which greatly increased the turnout.

Ward results
An asterisk denotes an incumbent

Baildon ward

Bingley ward

Bingley Rural ward

Bolton & Undercliffe ward

Bowling & Barkerend ward

Bradford Moor ward

City ward

Clayton & Fairweather Green ward

Craven ward

Eccleshill ward
In 2006, Colin McPhee stood in this ward successfully as a Liberal Democrat candidate.

Great Horton ward

Heaton ward
Imdad Hussain joined the Peace Party in 2012, following suspension from the Labour Party over failing to declare a company directorship. He became the party's first and only Councillor.

Idle & Thackley ward

Ilkley ward

Keighley Central ward

Keighley East ward

Keighley West ward

Little Horton ward

Manningham ward

Queensbury ward
In June 2011 Paul Cromie and his wife Lynda (also a councillor) left the British National Party citing 'personal reasons'. They now stand as The Queensbury Ward Independents.

Royds ward

Shipley ward

Thornton & Allerton ward

Toller ward
Imran Hussain was later selected (in 2012) to contest the Bradford West constituency, which resulted in a shock victory for George Galloway of the Respect Party.

Tong ward

Wharfedale ward
In February 2012 Chris Greaves was sacked by the Conservative Party for frequently voting with Labour at council meetings. A month later he formed The Independents with fellow ex-Conservative Adrian Naylor (Craven ward).

Wibsey ward

Windhill & Wrose ward

Worth Valley ward

Wyke ward

By-elections between 2010 and 2011 elections
Vote changes correspond to 2010 Council election.

Worth Valley ward
This was triggered by the resignation of Cllr. Kris Hopkins (Conservative Party), who resigned having won the Keighley parliamentary seat in the 2010 general election.

References

2010
Bradford
Bradford
2010s in West Yorkshire